Franklin Village Historic District is a national historic district located at Franklin in Delaware County, New York. The district contains 242 contributing buildings, four contributing sites, and one contributing object.  The majority of the buildings are residential, with three churches, 12 commercial buildings, one industrial structure, five institutional and/or public buildings, four historic cemeteries, and one monument. One of the churches is a board and batten structure reportedly designed by Richard Upjohn and his son Richard M. Upjohn in 1865. Located within the district is the separately listed New Stone Hall.

It was listed on the National Register of Historic Places in 1984.

Gallery

See also
National Register of Historic Places listings in Delaware County, New York

References

External links

National Register of Historic Places in Delaware County, New York
Federal architecture in New York (state)
Italianate architecture in New York (state)
Historic districts in Delaware County, New York
Historic districts on the National Register of Historic Places in New York (state)